Gnophomyia tristissima is a species of limoniid crane flies in the family Limoniidae. It is all black with yellow halteres.

References

External links

 

Limoniidae
Articles created by Qbugbot
Insects described in 1859